Rising Sun High School is a public high school located in North East, Maryland. It is a member of Cecil County Public Schools.

References

https://marylandpublicschools.org/partners/pages/toy/index.aspx

Public high schools in Maryland
Schools in Cecil County, Maryland